Bufo stuarti is a species of toad found in Southeast Asia. Known only from northern Myanmar and northeastern India. The type locality is the Putao plains.

References 

Frogs of India
Amphibians described in 1929
stuarti